is a city in Yamaguchi Prefecture, Japan. The city was founded on March 31, 1954. As of October 1, 2016, the city has an estimated population of 34,882 and a population density of 97 persons per km². The total area is 357.92 km².

Nagato consists of five smaller towns that were absorbed over the past several years. The towns are Fukawa, Senzaki, Yuya, Heki and Misumi (all from Ōtsu District). Nagato also encompasses Omijima Island and the township of Kayoi.

The nearby Omijima Island has many pebbled beaches and scuba diving on one of its northern beaches. The island is reached by a large road bridge which connects the Senzaki Peninsula with the southern edge of the island.

There are many onsen on the southern edge of the town in Yumoto with hot springs.

History 
In the Tokugawa era, the area was under the jurisdiction of the Chōshū domain.

In the 2017 Japanese general election, 76.25% of Nagato's proportional ballots were cast for either one of the two parties in the conservative ruling coalition (the Liberal Democratic Party and Komeito) or one of the two minor LDP-allied conservative parties (Party for Japanese Kokor) and New Party Daichi), making it the most conservative city in the country for that election under this definition, and the second most conservative municipality overall behind Himeshima, Ōita.

Geography

Climate
Nagato has a humid subtropical climate (Köppen climate classification Cfa) with hot summers and cool winters. Precipitation is significant throughout the year, but is much higher in summer than in winter.

Demographics
Per Japanese census data, the population of Nagato in 2020 is 32,519 people. Nagato has been conducting censuses since 1920.

Transportation

Railways
West Japan Railway Company(JR Nishi Nihon)
San'in Main Line
Senzaki Branch Line (San'in Main Line)
Mine Line

Famous people 
 Misuzu Kaneko
 Shigeru Aburaya

Economy 
Fujimitsu Corporation, a manufacturer of fish surimi products, is headquartered in the city.

Recent annexion
On March 22, 2005, the towns of Heki, Misumi and Yuya (all from Ōtsu District) were merged into Nagato.

References

External links

 Nagato City official website 

Cities in Yamaguchi Prefecture